Sherman Park is a sixty-acre park in the New City neighborhood of South Side, Chicago.

It was designed by renowned landscape architects John Charles Olmsted and Frederick Law Olmsted, Jr., and celebrated Chicago architect Daniel Burnham. It opened in 1905.

The park's recreational facilities include two gymnasiums, a fitness center, a swimming pool, as well as outdoor space for basketball, tennis, baseball, soccer and football.

The park was named for John B. Sherman, Burnham's father-in-law and a founder of Chicago's Union Stock Yards.

The park was designed specifically to enrich the immigrant, working class residents of the surrounding neighborhood.

Murals

In 1912, eight students from the School of the Art Institute of Chicago painted murals in the Sherman Park fieldhouse that came to be known as the American History Series. These murals commemorate events such as the founding of Jamestown in 1607, the Marquette-Joliet Expedition of 1673, and George Rogers Clark's Illinois Campaign of 1778.

Over the years the murals became severely damaged due to accumulated soot and varnish. In 2004, restoration on the murals commenced with the park's inclusion in the Mural Preservation Effort, a joint project between the Chicago Park District and the Chicago Conservation Center. The restoration of the Sherman Park murals was completed in mid-2005.

References

Parks in Chicago
South Side, Chicago
Parks on the National Register of Historic Places in Chicago
1905 establishments in Illinois
Beaux-Arts architecture in Illinois
Historic districts on the National Register of Historic Places in Illinois